Lva Tolstoho Square, or Leo Tolstoy Square, is a triangular intersection in Kyiv, Ukraine named after author Leo Tolstoy. The three streets circumscribing the square include Lva Tolstoho Street, Lva Tolstoho Square, and Velyka Vasylkivska Street. The intersection serves as an entry point for Lva Tolstoho station, part of the Kyiv Metro.

The square is a tripoint where Pecherskyi District, Shevchenkivskyi District and Holosiivskyi District meet.

The square acts as the end point for the Equality March, Ukraine's largest LGBT pride parade.

References

Squares in Kyiv